Amazonsprattus scintilla, the Rio Negro pygmy anchovy, is a fresh-water anchovy that is endemic to the Amazon River system in South America.

References 

Anchovies
Monotypic ray-finned fish genera
Taxa named by Tyson R. Roberts
Fish of South America
Fish described in 1984